Pedro Salvador (born 14 September 1900, date of death unknown), better known as Xingó, was a Brazilian footballer. He played in one match for the Brazil national football team in 1922. He was also part of Brazil's squad for the 1922 South American Championship.

References

External links
 

1900 births
Year of death missing
Brazilian footballers
Brazil international footballers
Association footballers not categorized by position